Huitzila may refer to the following places in Mexico:

Huitzila, Hidalgo
Huitzila, Zacatecas

See also
 Huitzilac